Ancistrini is a tribe of catfishes of the family Loricariidae. Most are restricted to tropical and subtropical South America, but there are also several genus (Ancistrus, Chaetostoma, Hemiancistrus and Lasiancistrus) in southern Central America.

Taxonomy
Ancistrini have previously been considered a loricariid subfamily. However, the subfamily Hypostominae would be paraphyletic if Ancistrinae continued to be recognized. To continue recognizing the monophyly of this group while returning it to Hypostominae, Hypostominae was broken into several tribes. Pterygoplichthyini is sister to the tribe Ancistrini, which shares the derived presence of an evertible patch of plates on the cheek.

Description
Most Ancistrini species (except for some Pseudancistrus and Spectracanthicus) can be separated from all other loricariids except the Pterygoplichthyini by the presence of evertible cheek plates with hypertrophied odontodes.

References

 
Fish tribes
Catfish of South America
Freshwater fish of Central America
Freshwater fish of South America
Hypostominae